The men's 3000 metres steeplechase at the 1962 British Empire and Commonwealth Games as part of the athletics programme was held at the Perry Lakes Stadium on Saturday 24 November 1962.

This was the first time that the event was run at the Games, however the 2 mile steeplechase was contested in 1934 and 1938.

The event was won by Australian Trevor Vincent in 8:43.4 seconds, setting an inaugural Games record and breaking his own Australian record of 8:49.2. Vincent won by 15 yards ahead of the favoured Englishmen Maurice Herriott and fellow countryman Ron Blackney who won the bronze medal.

Records

The following records were established during the competition:

Final

References

Men's 3000 metres steeplechase
1962